Yeh Jhuki Jhuki Si Nazar is an Indian Hindi-language television drama series that premiered on 7 March 2022 on StarPlus and is also available digitally on Disney+ Hotstar. It stars Swati Rajput and Ankit Siwach. The series ended on 25 June 2022. It is the remake of Asianet's Malayalam series Karuthamuthu.

Plot

Diya Mathur, a topper in hotel management gets humiliated everywhere for her dark complexion. Being 32 years old she is not married as everyone rejects her for her complexion. Even though applying for front desk in her dream hotel, she was directed to the kitchen department due to her looks. Later she meets Armaan in a hotel, and he befriends her. Later Armaan's mother comes to Diya's house for alliance but instead of her chooses her younger sister Palki, who is fair-skinned and beautiful. Heartbroken Diya befriends Kajal Asthana in her workplace.

Diya and Armaan's constant meeting make them fall in love with each other. Armaan reveals his feelings to Krish, which Bhavna hears. Sudha and Bhavna plot and make Armaan misunderstand that Diya doesn't like him. Heartbroken, Armaan agrees for alliance with Palki.

On the engagement day, both families learn about Armaan and Diya's true feelings for each other. Sudha and Bhavna get tensed. On Palki's insistence that she doesn't love Armaan, Diya agrees for marriage with Armaan. Bhavna harms Diya's legs during the Haldi function. Against all odds, Diya and Armaan get married. Sudha is revealed to be a dominating woman who wants to control the lives of her family members. Though Sudha tries to adjust with Diya, Bhavna instigates her mind against the other. Sudha falls to Bhavna's words and tries to show Diya her place keeping her control superior over others. Armaan who is somewhat aware of Sudha's this behavior tries to balance situations for her. After marriage, Diya gets Armaan meet her friend Kajal who is revealed to Armaan's ex-wife who cheated on him.

Cast

Main
 Swati Rajput as Diya Mathur Rastogi– Anjali and Brij's elder daughter; Jhanvi and Palki's sister; Armaan's second wife
 Ankit Siwach as Armaan Rastogi – Sudha's elder son; Bhavna and Krish's brother; Kajal's ex-husband; Diya's husband

Recurring
 Manasi Joshi Roy as Sudha Rastogi – Armaan, Bhavna and Krish's mother
 Shabaaz Abdullah Badi as Arjun Kumar Kohli – Diya's ex-boyfriend; Armaan's rival
 Jayroop Jeevan as Brij Mohan Mathur – Anjali's husband; Diya, Jhanvi and Palki's father
 Neelu Kohli as Anjali Mathur – Brij's wife; Diya, Jhanvi and Palki's mother
 Preetika Chauhan as Kajal Asthana (formerly Rastogi) – Diya's friend, Armaan's ex-wife
 Swayam Joshi as School Boy 
 Sapna Rathore as Saloni Khanna - Armaan's childhood best-friend
 Mrinal Naveli as Palki Mathur – Anjali and Brij's youngest daughter; Diya and Jhanvi's sister; Krish's love interest 
 Saloni Jain as Janvi Mathur – Anjali and Brij's second daughter; Diya and Palki's sister
 Richa Tiwari as Bhavna Rastogi Raizada– Sudha's daughter; Armaan and Krish's sister; Pawan's wife
 Tehraan Bakshi as Pawan Raizada - Bhavna's husband; Armaan and Krish's brother-in-law; Sudha's son-in-law
 Krish Pathak as Krish Rastogi – Sudha's younger son; Armaan and Bhavna's brother; Palki's love interest
 Surabhi Tiwari as Ruby Bhatia – Diya's colleague
 Saurav Goyal as Vivek
 Saniya Nagdev as Nimmi – Matchmaker
 Ashish Bhargav as Mr. Chaddha
 Satyen Chaturvedi
 Gunjan Bhatia as Shalu
 Suraj Bharadwaj as Armaan's best friend
 Unknown as Rocky Tiwari

Guest

 Ayesha Singh as Sai Joshi from Ghum Hai Kisikey Pyaar Meiin  
 Sumbul Touqeer Khan as Imlie from Imlie

Production

Development 
The show had an initial working title of Chandni, later being retitled to Yeh Jhuki Jhuki Si Nazar.

Release
The first promo was launched on 29 January 2022 featuring Swati Rajput.

Adaptations

References

External links
 Yeh Jhuki Jhuki Si Nazar on Disney+ Hotstar

2022 Indian television series debuts
2022 Indian television series endings
Indian drama television series
StarPlus original programming
Hindi-language television shows